Sperone is a town and comune in the province of Avellino, in the Campania region of southern Italy.

Geography
The town is bordered by Avella, Baiano, Sirignano and Visciano.

References

Cities and towns in Campania